14 Friendly Abductions is a "best of" compilation album by Nina Hagen, released in 1996. AllMusic rated it 4 1/2 out of 5.

Track listing 

 "Zarah"
 "New York New York"
 "Smack Jack"
 "TV-Glotzer (White Punks On Dope)"
 "Spirit In The Sky"
 "African Reggae"
 "Universal Radio" (Universal Dance Mix)
 "My Sensation"
 "Iki Maska"
 "Wir Leben Immer Noch (Lucky Number)"
 "Cosma Shiva"
 "Zarah" (Dance Mix)
 "Zarah" (Dub)
 "My Way"

References

Nina Hagen compilation albums
1996 compilation albums
Albums produced by Giorgio Moroder
Albums produced by Keith Forsey
Albums produced by Mike Thorne
Sony BMG compilation albums